This is a list of people who have appeared on coins of the United Kingdom's colonies in the sterling zone. It does not include former colonies of the British Empire and their currencies. The reigning monarch has appeared on the obverse of all coins.

Ascension Island
Prince Andrew
1984: Fifty pence coin for his royal visit...

Falkland Islands
Prince Andrew
1985: Fifty pence coin for his opening of Mount Pleasant airport.
Charles, Prince of Wales (1948–)
1981: Fifty pence coin marking his marriage to Lady Diana Spencer.
Diana, Princess of Wales (1961–1997)
1981: Fifty pence coin marking her marriage to Prince Charles.
Queen Elizabeth the Queen Mother (1900–2002)
1980: Fifty pence coin marking her 80th birthday.

Gibraltar
Sir Winston Churchill (1874–1965)
1993: Fourteen ECU coin.
Queen Elizabeth the Queen Mother (1900–2002)
1980: One crown coin marking 80th birthday.
1990: One crown coin marking 90th birthday.
Jesus Christ
1990: Fifty pence coin marking Christmas.
2005: Fifty pence coin marking Christmas.
Joseph
1990: Fifty pence coin marking Christmas.
2003: Fifty pence coin marking Christmas.
Mary
1990: Fifty pence coin marking Christmas.
2003: Fifty pence coin marking Christmas.
2005: Fifty pence coin marking Christmas.
Prince Philip (1921–)
1997: Five pound coin marking the 50th anniversary of his wedding to Queen Elizabeth II (hand only).

Guernsey
Queen Elizabeth the Queen Mother (1900–2002)
1980: Twenty-five pence coin marking her 80th birthday.
William of Normandy
1966: Ten shilling coin marking 900 years since the Norman Conquest of England.
2005: One pound coin marking 915 years since his death.

Tristan de Cunha
Queen Elizabeth the Queen Mother (1900–2002)
1980: Twenty-five pence marking 80th birthday 
Admiral Horatio Nelson
2005: One crown coin marking 200 years since his death

See also 

 List of people on coins of the United Kingdom

References 

United Kingdom colonies